UVM is the University of Vermont, a university in Burlington, Vermont, USA.

UVM may also refer to:
 Universal Verification Methodology
 Universidad del Valle de México, a private university in Mexico
 UVM, a virtual memory system used in BSD-like operating systems including NetBSD
 Undervisningsministeriet, the Danish Ministry of Education